Tasmanian Times is an online news service in Hobart in Tasmania, Australia. An earlier Tasmanian Times existed in the nineteenth century (1867-1870).

It has been published for most of the 2000s by Lindsay Tuffin.

External link

References 

Newspapers in Hobart, Tasmania
Australian news websites